Tim Villiers Heald FRSL (28 January 1944 – 20 November 2016) was a British author, biographer, journalist and public speaker.

Life and writings
Heald was born in Dorchester, Dorset, England, and educated at Sherborne School, Dorset, and Balliol College, Oxford, gaining an MA in Modern History in 1965.

He wrote over 30 published books, including official biographies of HRH Prince Philip, Duke of Edinburgh (The Duke – a Portrait of Prince Philip, 1991), Hodder & Stoughton), HRH The Princess Margaret (Princess Margaret – a Life Unravelled (2007), Orion Books) and cricket commentator Brian Johnston.

Heald was also known for his mystery novels featuring Simon Bognor, special investigator, (10 titles), serialised by Thames TV, and more recently as creator of Dr Tudor Cornwall in a new crime trilogy published by Robert Hale Ltd: Death and the Visiting Fellow (2004), Death and the D'Urbervilles (2005), A Death on the Ocean Wave (2007). He subsequently returned to the newly knighted Simon Bognor and published two further novels Death in the Opening Chapter and Poison at the Pueblo with Crème de la Crime/ Severn House.

As a journalist, Tim Heald wrote for Punch, The Spectator, The Sunday Times (Atticus column), Daily Express (feature writer 1967–1972), The Times and The Daily Telegraph, and was a freelance book reviewer and feature and travel writer for various other publications. As a speaker, he was often a guest on Cunard cruise ships the QE2 and the Caronia. He was the author of Village Cricket (Little Brown, 2004), on which a Carlton TV series was based.

Heald worked as an academic in creative writing at the University of Tasmania and the University of South Australia between 1997 and 2001. He was a Fellow of the Royal Society of Literature. He was also a strong member of PEN International and chaired the Writers in Prison Committee.

Tim Heald lived in Fowey, Cornwall, for 15 years until 2011 but then moved to south Somerset, where his mother was born and where she and his father are buried.

Illness and death
Suffering from Parkinsonism and Lewy body dementia, Tim Heald died in Martock, Somerset 20 November 2016.

Bibliography

 Unbecoming Habits 
 Blue Blood Will Out  
 Deadline                               
 Let Sleeping Dogs Die     
 Just Desserts      
 Murder at Moose Jaw 
 Caroline R – novel chronicling a life similar to that of Princess Diana from her marriage to Prince Charles until her death in 1997 
 Masterstroke                           
 Class Distinctions   
 Red Herrings                                           
 Brought to Book 
 The Rigby File (editor)  
 Business Unusual      
 A Classic English Crime (editor)   
 It's a Dog's Life    
 The Making of Space 1999 
 John Steed, the Authorised Biography Vol 1
 HRH: The Man Who Will Be King (co-author with Mayo Mohs)    
 Networks
 The Character of Cricket  
 The Newest London Spy (editor)  
 By Appointment – 150 Years of the Royal Warrant and Its Holders 
 My Lord's   
 The Duke – Portrait of Prince Philip
 Honourable Estates - The English and their Country Houses  
 A Life of Love – The Life of Barbara Cartland
 Denis – The Authorised Biography of the Incomparable Compton 
 Brian Johnston – The Authorised Biography
 Beating Retreat – Hong Kong Under the Last Governor  
Death and the Visiting Fellow
Death and the D'Urbervilles
A Death on the Ocean Wave
Tomfoolery; edited work of Tom Baun compiled with his brother, Christopher
Jardine's Last Tour
My Dear Hugh – the collected letters of Richard Cobb
Death in the Opening Chapter
Poison at the Pueblo

References

External links 

 

1944 births
2016 deaths
Alumni of Balliol College, Oxford
English biographers
English male journalists
20th-century English novelists
21st-century English novelists
Fellows of the Royal Society of Literature
People educated at Sherborne School
People from Dorchester, Dorset
People from Fowey
English male novelists
Cricket historians and writers
20th-century English male writers
21st-century English male writers
Male biographers